Dragan Grivić (born 12 February 1996) is a Montenegrin football player. He plays for Sutjeska.

International career
He made his debut for Montenegro national football team on 5 June 2021 in a friendly against Israel. He played the full game in a 1–3 home loss.

References

External links
 
 

1996 births
Living people
Montenegrin footballers
Montenegro youth international footballers
Montenegro under-21 international footballers
Montenegro international footballers
Association football defenders
OFK Grbalj players
FK Sutjeska Nikšić players
Montenegrin First League players